A human rainbow is where a group of people form a pattern on the ground by placing themselves in the typical characteristics of a rainbow. For example, wearing the colours red, orange, yellow, green, blue, indigo, violet and forming a rainbow arch at the same time. Some human rainbows are formed in celebration of anniversaries and for charitable purposes. These human rainbows usually involve a large number of people participating and this has resulted in world records being broken. These records are officially recognised by the Guinness World Records.

Records 
 In 1997, 6,444 people formed a human rainbow at Transco Tower Park, Houston, Texas, United States.
 On October 6, 2002, 11,273 Hong Kong Polytechnic University  staff, students, alumni, friends and families united together and set a new world record. All wearing T-shirts and caps in seven rainbow colours, they formed the largest Human Rainbow in the world. This historic event, held in celebration of Hong Kong Polytechnic University 65th anniversary, aimed to raise fund for the University, the Children's Cancer Foundation and The Hong Kong Society for the Aged.
 On November 15, 2003, 11,750 individuals assembled in Floriana, Malta to break the record. The Prime Minister of Malta, Eddie Fenech Adami and members of the opposition also joined in. The money which was raised from the participants went to 23 different charity institutions.
 On September 18, 2004, over 31,000 students, faculty, staff and alumni of the Polytechnic University of the Philippines broke the record previously held by the Maltese. They used the human rainbow to celebrate the university's centennial, which was from 1904 to 2004, and to highlight the signing of the Declaration of Peace which will be submitted to the United Nations.

See also
 Human chain

References 
News articles
 Mamanglubi, Shianee (November 19, 2004). Students form world’s largest human rainbow. The Manila Bulletin Online.
 AFP (November 15, 2003). Maltese claim human rainbow record. Clarinet News.
 Zahra, Charlot (November 15, 2003). Malta breaks world record for largest human rainbow. di-ve news.

Websites
 Guinness World Records Largest Human Rainbow. Retrieved October 3, 2004.
 Hong Kong Polytechnic University We formed the largest Human Rainbow in the world on 6 October 2002 !. Retrieved October 4, 2004.
 Polytechnic University of the Philippines – Guinness World Record Largest Human Rainbow http://www.guinnessworldrecords.com/world-records/largest-human-rainbow/

External links 
 Message from Dr. Samuel M. Salvador, Acting President of the Polytechnic University of the Philippines
 Sponsors and acknowledgement of the Philippine human rainbow
 Photos of the Hong Kong human rainbow
 Photos of the Malta human rainbow
 More photos of the Malta human rainbow
 Photos of the Philippines Human Rainbow

Performance art